The 2022 ICC Men's T20 World Cup was the eighth ICC Men's T20 World Cup tournament, played in Australia from 16 October to 13 November 2022. Each team selected a squad of fifteen players before 10 October 2022. The player ages were as on 16 October 2022, the opening day of the tournament, and where a player played for more than one team in Twenty20 cricket, only their domestic team was listed (for example: at the time, Jos Buttler played for Lancashire Lightning).

Afghanistan
Afghanistan announced their squad on 15 September 2022.

Coach:  Jonathan Trott

1Hazratullah Zazai was ruled out of the remainder of the tournament due to an injury and was replaced by Gulbadin Naib who was initially in the list of standby players.

Australia
Australia announced their squad on 1 September 2022.

Coach:  Andrew McDonald

1Josh Inglis was ruled out of the tournament due to a hand injury and was replaced by Cameron Green.

Bangladesh
Bangladesh announced their squad on 14 September 2022.

Coach:  Russell Domingo

1Soumya Sarkar was initially named in the list of reserves and swapped places with Sabbir Rahman in the final squad.

2Shoriful Islam was moved up from the list of reserves and replaced Mohammad Saifuddin, who was added to the reserves.

England
England announced their squad on 2 September 2022.

Coach:  Matthew Mott

1Jonny Bairstow was ruled out of the tournament after sustaining a broken leg while playing golf. On 7 September, Alex Hales was named as Bairstow's replacement in the squad.

2Reece Topley rolled his ankle while stepping on a boundary cushion during a fielding drill. Tymal Mills, one of the standby players, was named as his replacement. 

3Luke Wood was added as a travelling reserve.

India
India announced their squad on 12 September 2022.

Coach:  Rahul Dravid

1Jasprit Bumrah was ruled out of the tournament after sustaining a back injury. On 14 October, Mohammed Shami was named as Bumrah's replacement.

2Deepak Chahar was removed from the list of standby players due to a back injury. Shardul Thakur replaced him in the standby list.

3Mohammed Siraj was added to the list of standby players.

Ireland
Ireland announced their squad on 20 September 2022.

Coach:  
Heinrich Malan

1Craig Young was ruled out of the tournament due to a chronic issue and was replaced by Graham Hume.

Namibia
Namibia announced their squad on 13 September 2022.

Coach:  Pierre de Bruyn

Netherlands
The Netherlands announced their squad on 6 September 2022.

Coach:  Ryan Campbell

New Zealand
New Zealand announced their squad on 20 September 2022.

Coach:  Gary Stead

Pakistan
Pakistan announced their squad on 15 September 2022.

Coach:  Saqlain Mushtaq

1Usman Qadir was moved to the list of standby players after failing to recover from a thumb injury. Fakhar Zaman, who was initially in the standby list, replaced him.

2Fakhar Zaman was ruled out of the tournament due to a knee injury and replaced by Mohammad Haris who was initially in the standby list.

Scotland
Scotland announced their squad on 22 September 2022. 

Coach:  Shane Burger

South Africa
South Africa announced their squad on 6 September 2022.

Coach:  Mark Boucher

1Dwaine Pretorius was ruled out of the tournament due to a fractured thumb. He was replaced by Marco Jansen who was moved up from the list of reserves.

2Lizaad Williams was added to the list of standby players.

Sri Lanka
Sri Lanka announced their squad on 16 September 2022.

Coach:  Chris Silverwood

1Two of the standby players, Ashen Bandara and Praveen Jayawickrama, will be travelling with the squad.

2Dilshan Madushanka was ruled out of the tournament due to a quadriceps injury. Binura Fernando who was in the list of standby players was approved as his replacement.

3Dushmantha Chameera was ruled out of the remainder of the tournament after injuring his left calf. Kasun Rajitha replaced him.

4Danushka Gunathilaka was ruled out of the remainder of the tournament due to a hamstring tear and was replaced by one of the standby players, Ashen Bandara.

5Binura Fernando was ruled out of the remainder of the tournament due to an injury he suffered during Sri Lanka's match against Australia. He was replaced by Asitha Fernando.

6Niroshan Dickwella and Matheesha Pathirana were added as standby players.

United Arab Emirates
United Arab Emirates announced their squad on 17 September 2022.

Coach:  Robin Singh

1Zawar Farid was ruled out of the remainder of the tournament due to a fractured foot. He was replaced by Fahad Nawaz who was one of the standby players.

West Indies
The West Indies announced their squad on 14 September 2022.

Coach:  Phil Simmons

1Shimron Hetmyer was ruled out of the tournament after missing his flight to Australia and was replaced by Shamarh Brooks.

Zimbabwe
Zimbabwe announced their squad on 15 September 2022.

Coach:  David Houghton

References

External links
 Squads for the ICC Men's T20 World Cup 2022 at the International Cricket Council

2022 ICC Men's T20 World Cup
Cricket squads
ICC Men's T20 World Cup squads